Coleophora quadrifurca is a moth of the family Coleophoridae. It is found in Shaanxi, China.

References

quadrifurca
Moths of Asia
Moths described in 1999